The 2011 World Solar Challenge was a race from Darwin, Northern Territory to Adelaide, South Australia in Australia. 37 vehicles were entered in the race, and the event was won by a car from Tokai University, Tokyo, Japan.

Results:

References

Solar car races
Scientific organisations based in Australia
Science competitions
Photovoltaics
Recurring sporting events established in 1987